Fishing Boats, Key West is a 1903 watercolor and graphite drawing by Winslow Homer. It is in the collection of the Metropolitan Museum of Art.

Early history and creation
Homer executed a quick pencil sketch of the dimensions and layout of the image, over which he used watercolor to fully develop the forms of the clouds, sea, and boats. The highlights of the image are untouched areas of the paper.

Description and interpretation
The work depicts fishing boats in the water off Key West, Florida.

References

Metropolitan Museum of Art 2017 drafts
Paintings in the collection of the Metropolitan Museum of Art
Paintings by Winslow Homer
Maritime paintings